Imène Ouneyssa Cherif Sahraoui (born September 14, 1995) is an Algerian sailor. She placed 37th in the Laser Radial event at the 2016 Summer Olympics.

References

External links
 
 
 

1995 births
Living people
Algerian female sailors (sport)
Olympic sailors of Algeria
Sailors at the 2016 Summer Olympics – Laser Radial
Place of birth missing (living people)
21st-century Algerian people